Armadale railway station may refer to:

Armadale railway station (Scotland), in Armadale, West Lothian
Armadale railway station, Melbourne, in Armadale, Victoria, Australia
Armadale railway station, Perth, in Armadale, Western Australia, Australia

See also 
Armdale station, in Armdale, Nova Scotia, Canada
Armidale railway station, in Armidale, New South Wales, Australia
Armadale (disambiguation)